Hercules was a sailing ship built in 1801 at South Shields, England. She made one trip transporting convicts to Port Jackson. She made two trips for the British East India Company (EIC), and was homeward bound from the second of these when the French privateer Napoleon captured her off the Cape of Good Hope.

Career
Hercules appears in Lloyd's Register in 1801 with Bates, master, Temple & Co. owners, and trade London–Botany Bay.

On 20 August 1801 Captain Luckyn Betts received a letter of marque for Hercules. He then sailed from Ireland on 29 November 1801, and arrived at Port Jackson on 26 June 1802. Hercules had sailed via Rio de Janeiro and the Cape of Good Hope, which she reached on 12 April 1802. In Ireland she had embarked 140 male and 25 female convicts. Forty-four male convicts died on the voyage.

Hercules left Port Jackson on 12 August bound for China. By 26 October she was at Whampoa. Homeward bound, she crossed the Second Bar - about 20 miles before Whampoa — on 3 January 1803, reached St Helena on 14 April, and arrived at The Downs on 19 June.

For her next voyage Hercules received a new master, and so required a new letter of marque, if he wanted one.  Richard Rabe(g?) received his letter of marque on 8 October 1803.

Capture 
The Register of Shipping for 1805 shows Hercules with Bates, master, and S. Temple, owner. Her trade is shown as London—Botany Bay.

As Hercules was returning to England from Bombay in 1805, the French privateer Napoleon captured her off Cape Agulhas and sent her into Port Louis.. At her capture, Hercules was carrying a cargo of cotton. In November 1805, Napoleon brought the prisoners from Hercules and from the whaler Diamond into the Cape Colony, then in Dutch hands. There Alex Tennant, resident in the Cape, arranged at his own expense, for the prisoners to be sent to St Helena, where they arrived in January 1806.

Notes, citations and references
Notes

Citations

References
 
 
 

1801 ships
Ships built by Temple shipbuilders
Convict ships to New South Wales
Ships of the British East India Company
Captured ships
Age of Sail merchant ships
Merchant ships of the United Kingdom
Sailing ships of England
1801 in England
Maritime incidents in South Africa
1803 in South Africa
Maritime incidents in 1805